For its Battle of Britain campaign against Great Britain during World War II, the German Luftwaffe had the following order of battle in the West. Luftflotte 2 was responsible for the bombing of southeast England and the London area and based in the Pas-de-Calais area in France. Luftflotte 3 targeted the West Country, Midlands, and northwest England, from bases a bit further north in France. Luftflotte 5 targeted the north of England and Scotland, from bases in Norway. Luftflotte 1 and Luftflotte 4 were based in Germany, but most of their bomber formations had been reassigned to the three Luftflotten engaged in the Battle of Britain. Some fighters were retained to provide air cover over Germany, however.

Luftflotte 2
Headquarters in Brussels, Belgium, commanded by Generalfeldmarschall Albert Kesselring, OOB from 13 August 1940.

Luftflotte 3
Headquarters in Paris, France, under Generalfeldmarschall Hugo Sperrle. OOB from 13 August 1940.

Luftflotte 5
Headquarters in Stavanger, Norway, led by Generaloberst Hans-Jürgen Stumpff. OOB from 13 August 1940.

Oberbefehlshaber der Luftwaffe
Headquarters in Berlin, Germany, led by Reichsmarschall Hermann Göring. OOB from 13 August 1940.

See also
 German Air Fleets in World War II
 Luftwaffe Organization

References

Bibliography
 Balke, Ulf. Der Luftkrieg in Europa - Die Operativen Einsätze des Kampfgeschwaders 2 im Zweiten Weltkrieg. Germany: Bernard and Graefe, 1989. 
 Bungay, Stephen. The Most Dangerous Enemy: A History of the Battle of Britain. London: Aurum Press 2000. (hardcover), (paperback 2002).
 de Zeng, H.L; Stanket, D.G; Creek, E.J. Bomber Units of the Luftwaffe 1933-1945; A Reference Source, Volume 1. Ian Allan Publishing, 2007. 
 de Zeng, H.L; Stanket, D.G; Creek, E.J. Bomber Units of the Luftwaffe 1933-1945; A Reference Source, Volume 2. Ian Allan Publishing, 2007.

External links
 BattleofBritain.com  - retrieved on 20 March 2007.

Battle of Britain
Luftwaffe
World War II orders of battle